Ghanghauli is a village in Khair tehsil of Aligarh district of the Indian state of Uttar Pradesh. It is located about 60 km from its district headquarters. Yamuna Express Way from Greater Noida to Agra of 165 km also passes through this village.

Demographics
Ghanghauli is inhabited by 546 families. According to Census of India 2011, the population was 3208, including 1727 males and 1481 females. Its literacy rate is above that of Uttar Pradesh at 72.32% compared to 67.68% in Uttar Pradesh.

Governance 
As per the Constitution of India and Panchayati Raj Act, Ghanghauli is administrated by a Pradhan who is a elected representative of the village.

Education
Schools/Colleges:

 Poorv Madhymik Vidhyalaya, Ghanghauli, Aligarh
 Shiksha Vikas Sabha, Ghanghauli, Aligarh
 Shri Lehri Singh Memorial Inter College, Ghanghauli, Aligarh

Sports 
 Cricket
 Kabbadi
 Volleyball
 Running (Sprinting) 
 Long Jump & High Jump
 Wrestling

Geography
Nearby villages include Jaidpura, Gaurola, Managarhi, Chandpur Khurd, Kheriya Khurd, and Gaurola-Nagliya.

References

Villages in Aligarh district